Coleraine Football Club is a semi-professional Northern Irish football club, playing in the NIFL Premiership, the highest level of the Irish League. The club, founded in 1927, hails from Coleraine, County Londonderry, and plays its home matches at The Showgrounds. Club colours are blue and white. The club won the Irish League title once (in 1973–74) and the Irish Cup on six occasions, most recently in 2017–18. They are also the only Irish League club to have won two successive all-Ireland competitions, lifting the Blaxnit Cup in 1969 and 1970. The club share a rivalry with Ballymena United.

History

The original Coleraine Football Club was founded in June 1927 originally called Coleraine FC  at a meeting in the local Orange hall. The club was formed out of a merger between two local sides: Coleraine Olympic and Coleraine Alexandra with  John McCandless being one of the founders and original player / manager for the club. The original club colours were all white, hence the club's original nickname – the Lilywhites. The club secured its first trophy in the 1931–32 season, defeating Ballymena United 3–0 at Solitude to win the Gold Cup.

In 1948, Coleraine reached its first Irish Cup final, going down 3–0 to Linfield. 1953 brought another appearance in the final and another defeat, again to Linfield, this time by five goals to nil. The 1950s saw the City Cup won for the first time (1953–54) and a second triumph in the Gold Cup (1958).

In 1961, chairman Jack Doherty persuaded Bertie Peacock to sign for Coleraine after he left Celtic. It would prove to be one of the most important transfers in the club's history. In 1965, Coleraine won the Irish Cup for the first time, defeating Glenavon 2–1 at Windsor Park, with goals from Shaun Dunlop and Derek Irwin. Coleraine thus gained its first experience of European football, against Soviet outfit Dynamo Kiev. Coleraine also won the first two Blaxnit all-Ireland cups in 1969 and 1970. Coleraine faced Kilmarnock in the 1970 Fairs Cup, and after a 1–1 draw in the first leg, the Bannsiders pulled off an historic 3–2 victory thanks to a Des Dickson hat-trick.

In 1972, the Irish Cup was won again, this time by beating Portadown 2–1, with goals from Des Dickson and Ivan Murray. The Holy Grail of the Gibson Cup was finally captured in 1974. Under the management of Bertie Peacock, the squad consisting of the likes of Des Dickson, Johnny McCurdy, Ivan Murray, Michael Guy and Vince Magee clinched the title ahead of Portadown. Bertie Peacock resigned in 1974 and Ivan Murray and Johnny McCurdy took over the reins. Murray continued as manager until 1978 and during his spell in charge the Irish Cup was won twice more – both times against Linfield. In 1975, it took three games before a goal from Jim "Chang" Smith in the second replay proved decisive. The 1977 victory was more emphatic with Liam Beckett, Des Dickson, Frankie Moffatt and Michael Guy scoring to give Coleraine a 4–1 victory. It was to be the club's last major trophy for 26 years.

In the 1980s there were two more cup finals, in 1982 and 1986, ending in defeats to Linfield and Glentoran respectively. For three seasons in a row in the mid-1980s the club finished second in the league behind Linfield, but in the first part of the 1990s Coleraine struggled. In 1995 they dropped into the First Division. Under Kenny Shiels, Coleraine won the inaugural First Division title and in its first season back in the top flight, won the Ulster Cup and came agonisingly close to the title, being pipped late on by Crusaders.

After a poor start to the 1999–00 season, Shiels resigned and was replaced by Marty Quinn, who rallied the team to finish second in the league behind Linfield and reach the Irish Cup semi-finals and the Coca-Cola Cup final. The next 2 seasons saw Coleraine finish fourth both times – potential title challenges being ruined by inconsistency. In 2002–03, Coleraine ended the season in third place and reached their first Irish Cup Final since 1986. In the final, they faced Glentoran as massive underdogs as the east Belfast side were looking to complete a clean sweep of trophies. After an early strike from Gareth McAuley was harshly ruled out, Coleraine kept going and scored through Jody Tolan. Despite increasing Glentoran pressure, Coleraine held on and the trophy famine was over. The following season saw the club reach the Irish Cup final again, but this time it was Glentoran who emerged triumphant.

The club's well-publicised financial problems had already overshadowed much of the 2003–04 season (despite a substantial donation from Cold Feet actor and Coleraine fan James Nesbitt) and at its end the club was forced to operate on a reduced budget, with several top players leaving. Despite this a top six finish was still achieved. The summer of 2005 saw more budget cuts and several big names leaving the Showgrounds, but this time the main concern for fans was the very future of the club. In August, the Inland Revenue filed for a winding-up order against Coleraine due to debts of £1.3 million. The Friends of Coleraine, worked tirelessly to persuade the High Court to postpone the hearing to allow them to put together a business plan to show that the club could be viably run. The club were liquidated on 9 August 2006 after they were allowed to enter administration, and a steering committee was set up to run the new club Coleraine FC Ltd.

The club went on to defeat Institute to win the North West Senior Cup for the 1st time. The club were incredibly allowed to stay in the Premier League and survival was ensured on the pitch, the Friends of Coleraine formally took control of the club and appointed a new board. In 2008 the club reached the Irish Cup final, but lost 2–1 to Linfield. Manager Marty Quinn resigned after that game and his successor, former assistant David Platt, led Coleraine to a fifth-place finish in his first season in charge.

On 27 March 2010, Coleraine narrowly lost on penalties against Glentoran in the final of the Co-Operative Insurance Cup. They also lost out to Linfield in the semi-finals of the Irish Cup. Despite possessing the two top goalscorers in the league, including 41 goal Rory Patterson, Coleraine could only finish the season in seventh. Despite the arrival of much-travelled English striker Leon Knight, inconsistent form throughout the first half of the 2010–11 season resulted in manager David Platt being sacked at the start of February. His replacement, Oran Kearney revitalised a struggling team and they climbed the table rapidly, again ending up seventh.

An overhaul of the squad over the summer saw Kearney put his mark on the club and the improvement shown in his first four months in charge then continued, with Coleraine performing well in the league and reaching the final of the IRN-BRU League Cup.

In 2012–13 Coleraine finished the season in 6th place after making the split five games previously.

In the 2015–16 season, after many average seasons, the Bannsiders hit title winning form, going on a winning run with it being halted after a while by Linfield. They started to fall away after that result, being knocked out of the Irish Cup by 3–1 by Portadown and finished in 5th place and lost the Europa League Play-off by 2–1 to Glentoran.

The 2016–2017 was a fairly good one for the Bannsiders with them currently sitting an impressive 3rd in the table and they also booked their place in the 2017 Irish Cup Final by beating Glenavon 2–1 to reach their first final in nine years, where they lost 3–0 to the double winners Linfield.

At the start of the 2017/18 season 'The Bannsiders' made a few new signings. Josh Carson, who came from Linfield originally playing for York City and Ipswich Town, signed for Coleraine as well as Aaron Traynor and Stephen O'Donnell from Warrenpoint Town and Institute respectively. They started their pre-season off well by beating Bangor City 3–1. They were then defeated in the Europa League first round qualifier by Haugesund from Norway. During the 2017/18 season, the Bannsiders went on an amazing run, losing once only to Linfield in the NIFL Premiership, finally finishing in second place, two points behind Crusaders. Although Coleraine did not attain the title, a sixth Irish Cup triumph was secured when they defeated Cliftonville in the final of that competition in May, thanks to the heroics of starlet Aaron Burns.

Oran Kearney left the club to take over at SPFL Premiership side St. Mirren in September 2018, and was replaced by Dungannon Swifts manager Rodney McAree, who guided Coleraine to a sixth-place finish and an Irish Cup semi-final. Following a failure to win the Europa League playoffs, McAree was sacked on 10 May 2019, having only been in charge for eight months. Kearney departed St. Mirren via mutual agreement to rejoin Coleraine as manager on 3 July 2019, citing family reasons as the main reason for leaving the Scottish side. Kearney settled back into his role as manager of Coleraine for a second spell. The summer transfer window of 19/20 caused some controversy with Kearney selling star striker Jamie McGonigle to Crusaders for £50,000, while Aaron Burns was also allowed to leave for free.
Despite losing two key players, Coleraine started the season well, recording notable victories over reigning Champions and runners ups, Linfield and Ballymena respectively. With the club involved in a five way title race, the club opted to bolster their squad in the January window with the signing of Nixon from Carrick Rangers. In February 2020, Coleraine beat Crusaders 2-1 in the Bet McLean League Cup final to win the first major trophy of the season, with another two still up for grabs. Coleraine were second four points behind Linfield and in an Irish Cup semi-final until the season was stopped due to the Covid-19 pandemic. Coleraine still qualified for the 2020 UEFA Europa League Qualifiers and were drawn against Slovenian champions NK Maribor, who played the likes of Chelsea and Sevilla in the UEFA Champions League a few years previous. Despite being massive underdogs, Coleraine won the game on penalties, sending them through to the second qualifying round, having defeated La Fiorita in the round previous to Maribor. The Bannsiders were drawn at home to SPFL Premiership side Motherwell and having been 2-0 down at half time, brought the game back to 2-2 and managed to hold 10-man Motherwell off until penalties, but the Scottish side progressed through thanks to goalkeeper Trevor Carson's heroics in the penalty shootout.

European record

Overview

Matches

UEFA ranking

Current squad

On loan

Non-playing staff
President: Hugh Wade
Honorary Vice President: Victor Hunter & Hunter McClelland
Chairman: Colin McKendry
Vice Chairman: Raymond Smyth
General Manager: Stevie McCann
Matchday Secretary: Hunter McClelland
Chaplain: Reverend Robert McMullan
Assistant Manager: William Murphy
Goalkeeping Coach: Michael Doherty
First Team Coach: Trevor McKendry
First Team Coach: Steven Douglas
Kit Manager: Darrell Coyles
Strength & Conditioning Coach: Chris Gregg
Senior Academy Director: Ollie Mullan
Junior Academy Director:David Platt
Ladies Manager:Alison Nicholl
Treasurer: Colin McKendry

Managerial history
 Jock McIntyre (1929 – 1931)
 Willie Buchan (1953 – 1954)
 Bertie Peacock (1961-1974)
Ivan Murray/Johnny McCurdy  (1974-1978)
 Des Dickson (July 1981 – June 1983)
 Kenny Shiels
 Jim Platt (1985–1991)
 Marty Quinn (Oct 1999 – May 8, 2008)
David Platt (2008 - 2011)
 Aidy McLaughlin (interim) (30 Jan 2011 – 5 Feb 2011)
 Oran Kearney (5 Feb 2011 – 6 Sep 2018)
 Rodney McAree (14 Sep 2018 – 10 May 2019)
 Oran Kearney (3 July 2019 – )

Honours

Senior honours
Irish League: 1
1973–74
Irish Cup: 6
1964–65, 1971–72, 1974–75, 1976–77, 2002–03, 2017–18
Irish League Cup: 2
1987–88, 2019–20
City Cup: 2
1953–54, 1968–69
Gold Cup: 4
1932, 1958, 1969, 1975
Ulster Cup: 8
1965–66, 1968–69, 1969–70, 1972–73, 1975–76, 1985–86, 1986–87, 1996–97
Top Four Cup
1968–69
North West Senior Cup: 23
1952–53†, 1954–55, 1955–56, 1957–58 (shared), 1958–59, 1960–61, 1964–65, 1966–67, 1967–68, 1969–70, 1980–81, 1981–82, 1982–83, 1987–88, 1988–89, 1991–92, 1994–95, 2001–02, 2003–04, 2005–06, 2007–08, 2009–10, 2012–13
Irish League First Division: 1
1995–96
Blaxnit Cup: 2
1968–69, 1969–70
Irish News Cup: 1
1995–96

† Won by Coleraine Reserves

Intermediate honours
Irish Intermediate Cup: 2
1964–65†, 1968–69†
George Wilson Cup: 4
1954–55†, 1985–86†, 1991–92†, 1995–96†
Craig Memorial Cup: 3
1984–85†, 1986–87†, 2013–14†

† Won by Coleraine Reserves

References

External links
 Official Website
 Coleraine Statistics and Results at the Irish Football Club Project

 
Association football clubs in Northern Ireland
Association football clubs established in 1927
Coleraine
NIFL Premiership clubs
Association football clubs in County Londonderry
1927 establishments in Northern Ireland